Just Friends (commonly abbreviated as JF Crew) is an American funk rock band from Dublin, California, formed in 2013. They are currently signed to Pure Noise Records and have released 2 studio albums.

History

Formation
The band formed in early 2013 by Sam Kless in his parents' garage in Dublin, California. Enlisting help from his former high school marching band and jazz band classmates Just Friends began as a punk rock band, but largely abandoned the genre in favor of funk rock and pop rap

Rock to the Rhythm era
In 2015 the band released its first studio album, Rock to the Rhythm through Open Door Records. Their writing at the time was largely influenced by pop punk and emo bands like The Motorcycle Industry and Walter Mitty and his Makeshift Orchestra. During this time the band embarked on various DIY tours around the US and released a split with Prince Daddy & The Hyena in 2016.

Nothing but Love
In 2017 the band added vocalist Brond and saw the return of Kevin Prochnow on bass. On April 9, 2017, the band released three tracks promoting the upcoming album, Nothing but Love. The band continued to tour the US and gain traction at festivals like The Fest. Originally released in 2018 through Counter Intuitive Records the album was praised for its diverse, genre-blending sound. Just Friends continued to tour the US and the UK & Europe from Fall 2018 to early 2019. On February 14, 2019, the band announced they were signing to Pure Noise Records and re-releasing Nothing but Love on March 15 through the new label. The band continued to tour on the album, supporting Mayday Parade, State Champs,  The Wonder Years, and more across all dates of the first and last Sad Summer Fest. In the fall the band embarked on a headlining tour with support from Save Face, followed by a string of dates supporting The Story So Far.

Band Members
Current members
 Sam Kless - vocals, guitar, percussion (2013–Present)
 Brianda "Brond" Goyos Leon - vocals (2017–Present)
 Brandon Downum - guitar, vocals (2013–Present)
 Matt Yankovich - guitar (2014–Present)
 Kevin Prochnow - bass (2013, 2016–Present)
 Avi Dey - trumpet, percussion (2013–Present)
 Ben Donlon - drums (2013–Present)
 Eric Butler - trombone, vocals, percussion (2014–Present)

Touring members
 Bart Starr - bass (2017-2019) 
 Kory Gregory - bass (2016) 

Past members
 Chris Palowitch - trombone, keyboards, synthesizer (2013–2020)

Discography

Studio albums
 Rock to the Rhythm (2015)
 Nothing but Love (2018)
 Hella (2022)

EPs and singles
 Nothing but Love Promo Tape (2017)
 Fever - single (2019)
JF Crew, Volume 2 (2021)

References

Funk rock musical groups
Pop-rap groups
Musical groups from California
Musical groups established in 2013
2013 establishments in California